is a Japanese photographer.

The Tokyo Photographic Art Museum holds several of his works.

References

External links
 

Japanese photographers
1971 births
Living people
Place of birth missing (living people)